Gibraltar Hebrew School, also Talmud Torah Hebrew School, is a government school in the British Overseas Territory of Gibraltar. The foundation stone of the school, designed by Samuel Levy, was laid on 3 September 1895 in a ceremony attended by the Rabbi of Gibraltar and the local Jewish community. It was inaugurated in 1898.
A mixed school, as of 2013 it had about 150 pupils.

Notable alumni
Albert Poggio

References

Schools in Gibraltar
School buildings completed in 1898
Jewish schools
Educational institutions established in 1898
1898 establishments in Gibraltar